John "Jack" Fee  (December 23, 1867 – March 3, 1913), was a professional baseball player who played pitcher in the Major Leagues. He pitched in seven games, making three starts, for the 1889 Indianapolis Hoosiers of the National League. He continued to play in the minor leagues through 1895, primarily in the Pennsylvania State League.

References

1867 births
1913 deaths
Major League Baseball pitchers
Indianapolis Hoosiers (NL) players
Baseball players from Pennsylvania
19th-century baseball players
Binghamton Crickets (1880s) players
Portsmouth Lillies players
Elmira Gladiators players
Minneapolis Millers (baseball) players
Omaha Lambs players
Harrisburg Ponies players
Scranton Indians players
Lebanon Pretzel Eaters players
Allentown Colts players
Scranton Miners players
Hazleton Barons players
Carbondale Anthracites players
Pottsville Colts players